Cary Sidney "C. J." Reavis II (born November 27, 1995) is an American football safety who plays for the Saskatchewan Roughriders of the Canadian Football League. He played college football at Marshall.

Early life and high school
Reavis was born in and grew up in Chester, Virginia and attended Thomas Dale High School. He was rated as a four star recruit by 247Sports and Rivals.com, who also rated him 20th athlete nationally and 250th-ranked college prospect overall for his class. He committed to play college football at Virginia Tech over offers from Tennessee, North Carolina, Ohio State, Oklahoma, Nebraska and Virginia.

College career
Reavis began his college career at Virginia Tech, playing mostly on special teams as a freshman and recording eight total tackles. He was slated to enter the Hokies starting lineup as a sophomore but was ultimately dismissed from the university going into his sophomore year due to an unspecified student conduct violation. He then transferred to East Mississippi Community College, where he played for one year and was featured in the Netflix series Last Chance U. In his only season at East Mississippi, Reavis recorded 40 tackles, eight passes broken up and two interceptions before transferring to Marshall University. Over the course of his two seasons at Marshall, Reavis recorded 132 tackles and an interception in 21 games played.

Professional career

Jacksonville Jaguars
Reavis signed with the Jacksonville Jaguars as an undrafted free agent on April 28, 2018. Reavis failed to make the 53-man roster out of training camp and was subsequently re-signed to the Jaguars' practice squad on September 2, 2018. Reavis was promoted to the Jaguars' active roster on November 27, 2018 – his 23rd birthday. Reavis made his NFL debut on December 2, 2018, recording one tackle. Reavis played in four games for the Jaguars during his rookie season, making one tackle.

Reavis was waived by the Jaguars during final roster cuts on August 31, 2019.

Atlanta Falcons
The Atlanta Falcons signed Reavis to their practice squad on November 5, 2019. On December 30, 2019, Reavis was signed to a reserve/future contract. On August 13, 2020, he was waived by the Falcons.

References

External links
Marshall Thundering Herd bio
Jacksonville Jaguars bio

1995 births
Living people
Players of American football from Virginia
People from Chester, Virginia
American football safeties
Virginia Tech Hokies football players
East Mississippi Lions football players
Marshall Thundering Herd football players
Jacksonville Jaguars players
Atlanta Falcons players
Saskatchewan Roughriders players